Herbert John Hampden Alpass (7 August 1906 – 16 March 1999) was an English first-class cricketer who played in seven matches between 1926 and 1928 for Gloucestershire. His highest score of 18* came when playing for Gloucestershire in the 1928 match against Oxford University Cricket Club. His best bowling of 2/42 came in the same match.

Alpass studied at Clifton College  in Bristol and starred as a left-arm spinner in the college cricket team. Away from cricket, Alpass qualified as a solicitor and became chairman of Bristol Rovers Football Club in 1950. He spent 11 years as chairman, overseeing promotion to Division Two in 1953.

References

1906 births
1999 deaths
English cricketers
People from Berkeley, Gloucestershire
Gloucestershire cricketers
English football chairmen and investors
Bristol Rovers F.C. chairmen and investors
People educated at Clifton College
Sportspeople from Gloucestershire
20th-century English businesspeople